The 6th Asia Pacific Screen Awards were held in Queensland, Australia some time in late 2012.

Awards

Films and countries with multiple nominations

References

Asia Pacific Screen Awards
Asia Pacific Screen Awards
Asia Pacific Screen Awards
Asia Pacific Screen Awards